Sylvester Morand is a British actor, best known for his role as Nikolai Rostov in the BBC's 1972 dramatisation of War and Peace. He lives in West Hampstead, London, his brother, Timothy Morand lives nearby and is also an actor.  He is also a stage actor.

Filmography

Television
War and Peace (1972–73)
 I Remember Nelson (1982)
Bergerac S6E7 Retirement Plan (Christmas Special) (1988)

References

External links

People from West Hampstead
Living people
Year of birth missing (living people)
Place of birth missing (living people)
British male film actors
British male television actors